Enix is a municipality of Almería province, in the autonomous community of Andalusia, Spain.

Demographics

Notable people 
 Agustín Gómez-Arcos was born in 1933 in Enix and died on March 20, 1998 in Paris.

References

External links

  Enix - Sistema de Información Multiterritorial de Andalucía

Municipalities in the Province of Almería